William Morison may refer to:
 William Morison (1663–1739), MP for Haddingtonshire and Peeblesshire
 Sir William Morison (1781–1851), MP for Clackmannanshire and Kinross-shire
 William Morison (minister) (1843–1937), Scottish clergyman and advocate

See also
 William Morrison (disambiguation)